The 2015–16 Cupa Ligii was the second official season of the Cupa Ligii. Steaua București won the tournament for the second time in a row after defeating Concordia Chiajna in the final.

All times are CEST (UTC+2).

Schedule 
 Qualifying Round: 9–10 September 2015
 Quarter-finals: 14–15 October 2015
 First leg of semi-finals: 9–10 March 2016
 Second leg of semi-finals: 13–14 April 2016
 Final: 17 July 2016

Prize money 
 Winner:  €265,000
 Runner-up: €165,000
 Semi-final: €50,000
 Quarter-final: €25,000
 Qualifying Round: €20,000

Qualifying round

At this stage, all teams participate in 2015–16 Liga I season except for No. 1 (FC Steaua București) and 2 (ASA Târgu Mureș) 2014–15 Liga I season which directly qualified for the quarterfinals. Thus in this phase will be 12 teams will be divided in 6 games. The winners of those matches will qualify for the quarterfinals.

The teams qualified in this phase are:

- FC Astra Giurgiu

- FC Botoșani

- CFR Cluj

- CS Concordia Chiajna

- FC Dinamo București

- CSM Studențesc Iași

- CS Pandurii Târgu Jiu

- FC Petrolul Ploiești

- ACS Poli Timișoara

- Universitatea Craiova

- FC Viitorul Constanța

- FC Voluntari

All matches were played on 9–10 September 2015

Quarter-finals

At this stage, 8 teams qualified:

FC Steaua București – 1st place 2014–15 Liga I season

ASA Târgu Mureș – 2nd place 2014–15 Liga I season

the 6 teams that won in Qualifying Round

- FC Astra Giurgiu

- CS Concordia Chiajna

- CFR Cluj

- ACS Poli Timișoara

- FC Viitorul Constanța

- FC Dinamo București

These teams will be divided in four matches. The winners of those matches will qualify for the semifinals. All matches were played on 14–15 October 2015

Semi-finals 
In the semifinals qualified 4 teams, namely the winners of the quarterfinals.
Quarterfinals winners are:

1) CS Concordia Chiajna

2) FC Dinamo București

3) FC Astra Giurgiu

4) FC Steaua București

These teams will be divided in two matches. Matches will be played roundtrip. The winners of those matches will qualify for the League Cup final.

1st leg

2nd leg

Final

References

Cupa Ligii seasons